Carroll Baker (born May 28, 1931) is an American actress of film, stage, and television. Spanning a career of fifty years, Baker appeared in 66 feature and television films, as well as 16 television appearances and over 15 stage credits, including 3 Broadway productions. Her most prolific role was in Elia Kazan's 1956 film Baby Doll, which earned her a Golden Globe and an Oscar nomination for Best Actress. Throughout her career, she became an established movie sex symbol.

Baker began her acting career in New York City as a member of the Actors Studio, and starred in Broadway productions before her screen debut in Easy to Love (1953). After the critical success of Baby Doll, Baker worked consistently throughout the 1960s, starring in westerns such as How the West Was Won (1962), as well as independent films such as Something Wild (1961) and melodramas The Carpetbaggers (1964) and Sylvia (1965). After portraying Jean Harlow in 1965's Harlow, Baker initiated a legal dispute over her contract with Paramount Pictures, which ultimately led to her being blacklisted in Hollywood. Baker moved to Europe in the late 1960s, where she starred in multiple Italian horror and giallo films.

She saw a return to American cinema in Andy Warhol's Bad in 1977, and later received critical acclaim for her performance in Ironweed (1987) alongside Jack Nicholson and Meryl Streep. Baker worked in both television and film into the 1990s, and had supporting roles in the critically acclaimed Hollywood films Kindergarten Cop (1990) and David Fincher's The Game (1997). She formally retired from acting in 2003.

Screen

Films

Television series

Short subjects

Documentaries

Stage credits

References

Actress filmographies
American filmographies